Spring Mountain Vineyard is a  vineyard consisting of 135 different vineyard blocks scattered over the  estate in California's Napa Valley. Spring Mountain Vineyard was in fourth place among French and American wines at the historic Judgment of Paris wine competition in 1976.

Winery and vineyards
The elegant Victorian mansion, known on the estate as Miravalle, was commissioned by Mexican-American businessman Tiburcio Parrott in 1884, and designed by architect Albert Schroepfer. Schroepfer designed several other homes in similar elegant style, for example The Rhine House at Beringer Vineyards.

The original winery and cave was also established in 1885 by Parrott.

The estate now includes four adjacent vineyards including the  La Perla,  Miravalle,  Chevalier, and  Streblow (Alba). La Perla Winery and Vineyard were originally established in 1873 by Charles Lemme. The La Perla Winery building is still standing. This property contained the first Cabernet Sauvignon on Spring Mountain. The adjacent Chevalier and Miravelle properties were also established during the 19th century.

Falcon Crest

From 1981 until 1990, Spring Mountain Vineyards became known to television viewers as the setting for the CBS drama series Falcon Crest. Cast and crew would film exterior scenes here for six weeks each summer before relocating to Los Angeles to shoot interior scenes. The mansion, winery, and many acres of surrounding vineyards, served as the fictional home of ruthless matriarch Angela Channing, played by Jane Wyman.

References

Further reading
Taber, George M. Judgment of Paris: California vs. France and the Historic 1976 Paris Tasting that Revolutionized Wine. NY: Scribner, 2005.

External links
Spring Mountain Vineyard

Wineries in Napa Valley
Companies based in Napa County, California
St. Helena, California
Food and drink companies established in 1884
1884 establishments in California